Tillandsia muhriae is a species in the genus Tillandsia. This species is native to Bolivia.

Cultivars
Tillandsia 'Mystic Burgundy'

References

BSI Cultivar Registry Retrieved 11 October 2009

muhriae
Flora of Bolivia